DST Systems, Inc. is an American company that was acquired by SS&C Technologies in 2018. The company provided advisory, technology and operations outsourcing services to the financial services and healthcare industries. It was founded in February 1969 as Data·Sys·Tance, a subsidiary of Kansas City Southern Industries (KCSI) and is headquartered in Kansas City, Missouri, United States. , DST employed 13,420 people worldwide.

History
In 2005 and 2006, DST acquired CSC's Health Plan Solutions group and Amisys Synertech, Inc.

On January 11, 2018, SS&C Technologies Holdings, Inc. announced that it would acquire all outstanding DST stock at a share price of $84.

Expansion, partnerships and acquisitions
On February 24, 2016, DST completed an acquisition of alternative fund service provider Kaufman Rossin Fund Services (KRFS). .

March 27, 2017, DST to acquire remaining interest in Joint Ventures, Boston Financial Data Services, Inc. (BFDS) and International Financial Data Services Limited ("IFDS U.K."), from State Street Corporation.

May 7, 2017, DST Systems reported a share repurchase program worth $300 million.

January 11, 2018, SS&C acquired DST Systems for $84 per share in cash for an enterprise value of $5.4 billion, including assumption of debt.

External links
 
 SS&C Technologies Holdings, Inc. (NASDAQ:SSNC)

References 

Companies based in Kansas City, Missouri
Corporate spin-offs
Companies formerly listed on the New York Stock Exchange
2018 mergers and acquisitions